An empanada is a type of baked or fried turnover consisting of pastry and filling, common in Spanish, other Southern European, Latin American, and Iberian-influenced cultures around the world. The name comes from the Spanish  (to bread, i.e., to coat with bread), and translates as 'breaded', that is, wrapped or coated in bread.  They are made by folding dough over a filling, which may consist of meat, cheese, tomato, corn, or other ingredients, and then cooking the resulting turnover, either by baking or frying.

Origins 
The origin of empanadas is unknown but they are thought to have originated in Galicia, a region in northwest Spain. A cookbook published in Catalan in 1520, Llibre del Coch by Robert de Nola, mentions empanadas filled with seafood in the recipes for Catalan, Italian, French, and Arabian food.

By country and region

Argentina

Argentine empanadas are often served during parties and festivals as a starter or main course. Shops specialize in freshly made empanadas, with many flavors and fillings.

Every region of Argentina has its own characteristic variant.

Those of Salta are small, juicy and spicy, and contain potatoes, peppers and ground chili. The Jujuy variant adds peas and garlic. Its filling is called "recado" and the repulgue (the way of closing the empanada) "simbado". The La Rioja variant includes hard-boiled egg, red bell pepper, olives, and raisins. In Jujuy, there are two variants: "creoles" and "arabs". Those of Santiago are considered especially juicy. Those of Catamarca are similar but smaller. Tucumán is known for the empanada Creole; an annual "National Empanada" festival is held in Famaillá. Those of Famaillá are made with matambre and fried in good fat, competing with the "entreveradas" (mixed-grated), in which the matambre is mixed with chicken breast, garlic, ground chili, hard-boiled egg and cumin. Those of Mendoza are large and include olives and garlic. Those of San Juan have a higher proportion of onion, which made them juicier and slightly sweet, olives are also common and sometimes fat is also added to the "recado" or the dough. In San Luis they are big, seasoned with oregano and hot pepper, and kneaded with pork fat. In Córdoba, they were called "federal cake" or "empanadas de Misia Manuelita", famous because pears boiled in wine with cloves were added to their filling. Today they are not so sweet but it is tradition to sprinkle them with sugar. In Traslasierra they add carrots and potatoes. In the Litoral, where immigrants from various parts of the world predominated, Santa Fe, Entre Ríos and Corrientes fill them with river fish, being delicious the surubí, dorado or with white sauce and Goya cheese. In the Cordillera of Patagonia, they are made with lamb and on the coast with seafood. In Buenos Aires, the Creole empanada is so important that it has been declared a Cultural Heritage of Food and Gastronomy by the Argentine Ministry of Culture.

Belize 

In Belize, empanadas are known as panades. They are made with masa (corn dough) and typically stuffed with fish, chicken, or beans. They are usually deep fried and served with a cabbage or salsa topping. Panades are frequently sold as street food.

Chile

Empanadas are a staple part of Chilean cuisine. Commonly consumed in large quantities during the country's national day celebrations, many Chileans consider this to be their most representative dish. The most representative variety being the oven-baked Empanada de pino, which is filled with ground beef, minced onion, half or a quarter of a hard-boiled egg, and a single unpitted black olive.

Empanadas in Chile are eaten year-round and are either oven-baked or deep-fried, the latter also acting as a popular street food.

Ecuador

Empanadas de viento or "windy" empanadas are fried wheat based stuffed with stringy cheese and sprinkled with sugar. They have been given this appellation for their inflated appearance as if they have been filled with air. Empanadas de Viento can be made in cocktail size, appetizer size, as well as giant size that’s quite popular among the middle and working class. They are often eaten with coffee or with te de hierva luisa or lemongrass tea. 

In Ecuador, you can buy these empanadas from food stalls, markets, or restaurants. During religious holidays, women from the countryside fry empanadas at home and sell them in front of churches.

Empanadas de verde or Plantain empanada are plantain based and are cheese filled and fried. These type of empanadas are most commonly found in the coastal regions of the country. 

With the growth of Southern Cone and Colombian immigrants, wheat and meat based baked empanadas and corn based empanadas have also become popular.

El Salvador

El Salvador is one of few countries where the empanada is made with plantain rather than a flour-based dough wrapping. A popular sweet variation, empanadas de platano are torpedo-shaped dumplings of dough made from very ripe plantains, filled with vanilla custard, fried, then rolled in sugar. They may alternatively have a filling made from refried beans rather than milk-based custard, but the flavour profile remains sweet rather than savoury.

Indonesia

In Indonesia, empanadas are known as panada. It is especially popular within Manado cuisine of North Sulawesi where their panada has thick crust made from fried bread, filled with spicy cakalang fish (skipjack tuna) and chili, curry, potatoes or quail eggs. The panada in North Sulawesi was derived from Portuguese influence in the region. This dish almost similar to karipap and pastel, although those snacks have thinner crust compared to panada.

Philippines

Filipino empanadas usually contain ground beef, pork or chicken, potatoes, chopped onions, and raisins (somewhat similar to the Cuban picadillo), in a somewhat sweet, wheat flour bread. There are two kinds available: the baked sort and the flaky fried type. To lower costs, potatoes are often added as an extender, while another filling is kutsay (garlic chives).

Empanadas in the northern part of the Ilocos usually have savoury fillings of green papaya, mung beans, and sometimes chopped Ilocano sausage (chorizo) or longaniza and egg yolk. This particular variant is fried and uses rice flour for a crunchier shell. There have also been people who make empanada filled with mashed eggplant, scrambled eggs, and cabbage, which they call poqui poqui.

In Bulacan, empanada de kaliskis (lit. "scale empanada"), uniquely has a flaky multilayered crust resembling scales, hence the name. In Cebu, empanada Danao is a characteristically sweet-savory variant. It is filled with chopped chorizo and chayote, deep-fried, and dusted in white sugar before serving. In Zamboanga, empanada Zamboangueño is filled with chopped sweet potato, garbanzo beans, and served with a sweet vinegar dipping sauce.

Dessert versions of empanada also exist. Notable ones include empanaditas, which commonly has a filling of latik (coconut caramel), honey and nuts, or peanut butter. Kapampangan versions of empanaditas have a yema (custard) and cashew nut filling. In Cebu, sinudlan empanada is a small deep-fried empanada with bukayo (sweetened coconut meat) filling.

Sicily (Italy)

The Sicilian mpanatigghi are stuffed, consisting of  halfmoon-shaped panzarotti filled with a mixture of almonds, walnuts, chocolate, sugar, cinnamon, cloves and minced beef.  These are typical of Modica, in the province of Ragusa, Sicily. They are also known with the italianized word impanatiglie or dolce di carne (pasty of meat).

They were probably introduced by the Spaniards during their rule in Sicily which took place in the sixteenth century; this is suggested from the etymology of the name which comes from the Spanish "empanadas or empanadillas" (empanada), as well as from the somewhat unusual combination of meat and chocolate, which occurs several times in the Spanish cuisine. In past centuries for the preparation of 'mpanatigghi game meat was used but today beef is used.

United States
Empanadas, mainly based on South American recipes, are widely available in New York City, New Jersey, and Miami from food carts, food trucks, and restaurants. Empanadas are usually found in U.S. areas with a large Hispanic population, such as San Antonio, Los Angeles, and San Francisco.

Venezuela

Traditional Venezuelan empanadas are made with ground corn dough, though the modern versions are made with precooked corn. The dough may have a yellow color when toasted due to the addition of annatto. The fillings are very diverse, with the most conventional being cheese, shredded beef, chicken, cazón (school shark) in the Margaritan Island region especially, ham, black beans and cheese (commonly called "dominó") and even combinations of mollusks. The Empanadas have a half moon shape and are fried in oil. Sometimes, they may have more than one filling as in the case of Empanadas de pabellón which are made with the filling of shredded beef (or cazón in the Margarita Island region), black beans, slices of fried plantain, and shredded white cheese.

Similar foods
The empanada resembles savory pastries found in many other cultures, such as the molote, pirozhki, calzone, samosa, knish, kreatopitakia, khuushuur, and pasty.

In most Malay-speaking countries in Southeast Asia, the pastry is commonly called karipap (English: curry puff). In Chinese they have deep-fried jiaozi and Vietnamese they have bánh gối.

See also
 List of stuffed dishes
 Fatayer
 Pastel (food)
 Cornish pasty
 Chebureki
 Calzone
 Kibinai
 Meat pie
 Turnover (food)
 Samosa
 Samsa (food)
 Yau gok

References 

Argentine cuisine
Belizean cuisine
Chilean cuisine
Cuisine of the Southwestern United States
Ecuadorian cuisine
Galician cuisine
Indonesian cuisine
Italian cuisine
Latin American cuisine
Mexican cuisine
Paraguayan cuisine
Philippine cuisine
Portuguese cuisine
Puerto Rican cuisine
Savoury pies
Spanish cuisine
Stuffed dishes
Tapas
Uruguayan cuisine
Venezuelan cuisine
Pascuense cuisine
Guamanian cuisine